Lukashin (formerly, Imeni Mikoyana), is a village in the Armavir Province of Armenia. 

It is named after Sargis Lukashin (1883-1937), President of the Armenian Council of People's Commissars.

See also 
Armavir Province

References 

World Gazetteer: Armenia – World-Gazetteer.com

Populated places in Armavir Province
Yazidi populated places in Armenia